Syed Salahuddin Zaki is a Bangladeshi film director, producer and film writer. He won the Bangladesh National Film Award for Best Dialogue for the film Ghuddi (1980). He was awarded Ekushey Padak in 2021.

Selected films

As a director
 Ghuddi - 1980
 Ja Hariye Jay - 2022

As a producer
 Ghuddi - 1980 
 Laal Benarasi - 1990
 Ayna Bibir Pala - 1990

As a writer

Awards and nominations
National Film Awards

References

External links

Living people
1946 births
Bangladeshi film directors
Best Dialogue National Film Award (Bangladesh) winners
Bangladeshi television directors
Bangladeshi male writers
Bangladeshi film producers
Recipients of the Ekushey Padak